Hong Bi-ra (born September 14, 1996), is a South Korean actress. She is known for her roles in Beautiful Vampire (2018) and Again My Life (2022).

Filmography

Film

Television series

Web series

References

External links
 Hong Bi-ra at Awesome Ent
 

1996 births
Living people
South Korean web series actresses
South Korean film actresses
South Korean television actresses
21st-century South Korean actresses